In mathematics, the axiom of regularity (also known as the axiom of foundation) is an axiom of Zermelo–Fraenkel set theory that states that every non-empty set A contains an element that is disjoint from A. In first-order logic, the axiom reads:
 
The axiom of regularity together with the axiom of pairing implies that no set is an element of itself, and that there is no infinite sequence (an) such that ai+1 is an element of ai for all i. With the axiom of dependent choice (which is a weakened form of the axiom of choice), this result can be reversed: if there are no such infinite sequences, then the axiom of regularity is true. Hence, in this context the axiom of regularity is equivalent to the sentence that there are no downward infinite membership chains.

However, regularity makes some properties of ordinals easier to prove; and it not only allows induction to be done on well-ordered sets but also on proper classes that are well-founded relational structures such as the lexicographical ordering on 

Given the other axioms of Zermelo–Fraenkel set theory, the axiom of regularity is equivalent to the axiom of induction. The axiom of induction tends to be used in place of the axiom of regularity in intuitionistic theories (ones that do not accept the law of the excluded middle), where the two axioms are not equivalent.

In addition to omitting the axiom of regularity, non-standard set theories have indeed postulated the existence of sets that are elements of themselves.

Elementary implications of regularity

No set is an element of itself
Let A be a set, and apply the axiom of regularity to {A}, which is a set by the axiom of pairing. We see that there must be an element of {A} which is disjoint from {A}. Since the only element of {A} is A, it must be that A is disjoint from {A}. So, since , we cannot have A ∈ A (by the definition of disjoint).

No infinite descending sequence of sets exists
Suppose, to the contrary, that there is a function, f, on the natural numbers with f(n+1) an element of f(n) for each n. Define S = {f(n): n a natural number}, the range of f, which can be seen to be a set from the axiom schema of replacement. Applying the axiom of regularity to S, let B be an element of S which is disjoint from S. By the definition of S, B must be f(k) for some natural number k. However, we are given that f(k) contains f(k+1) which is also an element of S. So f(k+1) is in the intersection of f(k) and S. This contradicts the fact that they are disjoint sets. Since our supposition led to a contradiction, there must not be any such function, f.

The nonexistence of a set containing itself can be seen as a special case where the sequence is infinite and constant.

Notice that this argument only applies to functions f that can be represented as sets as opposed to undefinable classes. The hereditarily finite sets, Vω, satisfy the axiom of regularity (and all other axioms of ZFC except the axiom of infinity). So if one forms a non-trivial ultrapower of Vω, then it will also satisfy the axiom of regularity. The resulting model  will contain elements, called non-standard natural numbers, that satisfy the definition of natural numbers in that model but are not really natural numbers. They are "fake" natural numbers which are "larger" than any actual natural number. This model will contain infinite descending sequences of elements. For any actual natural number k, . This is an unending descending sequence of elements. But this sequence is not definable in the model and thus not a set. So no contradiction to regularity can be proved.

Simpler set-theoretic definition of the ordered pair
The axiom of regularity enables defining the ordered pair (a,b) as {a,{a,b}}; see ordered pair for specifics. This definition eliminates one pair of braces from the canonical Kuratowski definition (a,b) = {{a},{a,b}}.

Every set has an ordinal rank 
This was actually the original form of the axiom in von Neumann's axiomatization.

Suppose x is any set. Let t be the transitive closure of {x}. Let u be the subset of t consisting of unranked sets. If u is empty, then x is ranked and we are done. Otherwise, apply the axiom of regularity to u to get an element w of u which is disjoint from u. Since w is in u, w is unranked. w is a subset of t by the definition of transitive closure. Since w is disjoint from u, every element of w is ranked. Applying the axioms of replacement and union to combine the ranks of the elements of w, we get an ordinal rank for w, to wit . This contradicts the conclusion that w is unranked. So the assumption that u was non-empty must be false and x must have rank.

For every two sets, only one can be an element of the other 
Let X and Y be sets. Then apply the axiom of regularity to the set {X,Y} (which exists by the axiom of pairing). We see there must be an element of {X,Y} which is also disjoint from it. It must be either X or Y. By the definition of disjoint then, we must have either Y is not an element of X or vice versa.

The axiom of dependent choice and no infinite descending sequence of sets implies regularity
Thus, by the axiom of dependent choice, there is some sequence (an) in S satisfying anRan+1 for all n in N. As this is an infinite descending chain, we arrive at a contradiction and so, no such S exists.

Regularity and the rest of ZF(C) axioms 
For his proof in modern notation see  for instance.

The axiom of regularity was also shown to be independent from the other axioms of ZF(C), assuming they are consistent. The result was announced by Paul Bernays in 1941, although he did not publish a proof until 1954. The proof involves (and led to the study of) Rieger-Bernays permutation models (or method), which were used for other proofs of independence for non-well-founded systems ( and ).

Regularity and Russell's paradox 
Naive set theory (the axiom schema of unrestricted comprehension and the axiom of extensionality) is inconsistent due to Russell's paradox. In early formalizations of sets, mathematicians and logicians have avoided that contradiction by replacing the axiom schema of comprehension with the much weaker axiom schema of separation. However, this step alone takes one to theories of sets which are considered too weak. So some of the power of comprehension was added back via the other existence axioms of ZF set theory (pairing, union, powerset, replacement, and infinity) which may be regarded as special cases of comprehension. So far, these axioms do not seem to lead to any contradiction. Subsequently, the axiom of choice and the axiom of regularity were added to exclude models with some undesirable properties. These two axioms are known to be relatively consistent.

In the presence of the axiom schema of separation, Russell's paradox becomes a proof that there is no set of all sets. The axiom of regularity together with the axiom of pairing also prohibit such a universal set.  However, Russell's paradox yields a proof that there is no "set of all sets" using the axiom schema of separation alone, without any additional axioms.  In particular, ZF without the axiom of regularity already prohibits such a universal set.

If a theory is extended by adding an axiom or axioms, then any (possibly undesirable) consequences of the original theory remain consequences of the extended theory. In particular, if ZF without regularity is extended by adding regularity to get ZF, then any contradiction (such as Russell's paradox) which followed from the original theory would still follow in the extended theory.

The existence of Quine atoms (sets that satisfy the formula equation x = {x}, i.e. have themselves as their only elements) is consistent with the theory obtained by removing the axiom of regularity from ZFC. Various non-wellfounded set theories allow "safe" circular sets, such as Quine atoms, without becoming inconsistent by means of Russell's paradox.

Regularity, the cumulative hierarchy, and types 
In ZF it can be proven that the class , called the von Neumann universe, is equal to the class of all sets. This statement is even equivalent to the axiom of regularity (if we work in ZF with this axiom omitted).

 wrote that "The idea of rank is a descendant of Russell's concept of type". Comparing ZF with type theory, Alasdair Urquhart wrote that "Zermelo's system has the notational advantage of not containing any explicitly typed variables, although in fact it can be seen as having an implicit type structure built into it, at least if the axiom of regularity is included. The details of this implicit typing are spelled out in [Zermelo 1930], and again in a well-known article of George Boolos [Boolos 1971]."

 went further and claimed that:

In the same paper, Scott shows that an axiomatic system based on the inherent properties of the cumulative hierarchy turns out to be equivalent to ZF, including regularity.

History 

Mirimanoff called a set x "regular" (French: "ordinaire") if every descending chain x ∋ x1 ∋ x2  ∋ ... is finite. Mirimanoff however did not consider his notion of regularity (and well-foundedness) as an axiom to be observed by all sets; in later papers Mirimanoff also explored what are now called non-well-founded sets ("extraordinaire" in Mirimanoff's terminology).

 and  pointed out that  non-well-founded sets are superfluous (on p. 404 in van Heijenoort's translation) and in the same publication von Neumann gives an axiom (p. 412 in translation) which excludes some, but not all, non-well-founded sets. In a subsequent publication,  gave the following axiom (rendered in modern notation by A. Rieger):

 .

Regularity in the presence of urelements 

Urelements are objects that are not sets, but which can be elements of sets. In ZF set theory, there are no urelements, but in some other set theories such as ZFA, there are. In these theories, the axiom of regularity must be modified. The statement "" needs to be replaced with a statement that  is not empty and is not an urelement.

See also
Non-well-founded set theory
Scott's trick
Epsilon-induction

References

Sources
 
 
 reprinted in 

 

 
 

 
  Reprinted in From Frege to Gödel, van Heijenoort, 1967, in English translation by Stefan Bauer-Mengelberg, pp. 291–301.

 
; translation in 

; translation in

External links

Inhabited set and the axiom of foundation on nLab

Axioms of set theory
Wellfoundedness